César Solaun Solana (born December 29, 1970, in Bilbao) is a Spanish former professional cyclist.

Major results

1995
 1st Stage 2 Vuelta a los Valles Mineros
1996
 4th Road race, National Road Championships
 5th Overall Volta ao Alentejo
 5th Subida al Naranco
1997
 2nd Road race, National Road Championships
 3rd Clásica de Sabiñánigo
 5th Overall Vuelta a los Valles Mineros
 5th GP Villafranca de Ordizia
 8th Overall Volta a Catalunya
 9th Overall Vuelta a Asturias
 10th Overall Vuelta a La Rioja
1998
 3rd Overall Volta ao Alentejo
1st Stage 3
 8th Overall Tour of Galicia
2001
 1st Overall Vuelta a La Rioja
1st Stage 2
 4th La Flèche Wallonne
 8th GP Llodio
2002
 4th Clásica a los Puertos

Grand Tour general classification results timeline

References

External links

1970 births
Living people
Spanish male cyclists
Sportspeople from Bilbao
Cyclists from the Basque Country (autonomous community)